The Golden Retriever is a dog breed.

Golden Retriever may also refer to:

Golden Retriever (song), by Super Furry Animals
Golden Retriever (band), a musical group from Portland, Oregon